"Good Wilt Hunting" is a 44-minute long animated television film, starring the cast of Foster's Home for Imaginary Friends. It originally aired on Cartoon Network during Thanksgiving Day on November 23, 2006.

Plot 
Every five years, Madame Foster arranges a reunion of the imaginary friends with their creators. Wilt, whose creator is unknown and has never come to the reunion, becomes unusually agitated, making Bloo very curious. The night after the first day of the reunion, Wilt runs away without telling anyone or leaving any clues. This results in a chase around the world, in which Bloo, Mac, Eduardo, Coco, and Frankie, joined by creators Douglas, Adam, and police officer Nina Valerosa attempt to bring Wilt back home.

Along the way, Wilt gets off track when he helps out a variety of individuals in a town. Eventually, Wilt gets arrested for accidentally assisting some burglars when they moved some furniture to their truck. While in prison, Wilt shares his history with the inmates; his creator imagined him to help him become a better basketball player and the two became undefeated, but a local bully imagined his own imaginary friend, Foul Larry, to beat them and they lost. The following morning, the Foster's gang checks out of a motel, and are about to give up on their mission and just hope that Wilt decides to come back in the near future. They discover the same three criminals trying to hijack the bus. After finding out that Wilt is in jail, the group head over there only to find out that Wilt was freed in return for mowing all of the lawns in a nearby suburban area during his journey. At this point, the group assumes that Wilt must be after his original creator, and Mac then discovers that Wilt's creator is in Japan.

Meanwhile, Wilt finally arrives at the basketball court he and his creator used to play at. There, he is greeted by an imaginary friend from his past: a basketball scoreboard friend named Stats. Wilt reveals that he is back for a rematch against Foul Larry, and that his deformities originated from him losing the game to save his creator from accidentally being crushed by Foul Larry, causing his creator to become upset and Wilt left believing it was his fault. Despite this, Wilt loses the match again when his creator pulls him out of the same situation Wilt saved him from. As Wilt lies down on the ground in defeat, he is greeted by his friends and his creator Jordan Michaels (a parody of Michael Jordan). Jordan explains to Wilt that he was never upset with Wilt, but only with himself. He stated that he looked for him everywhere after that game 30 years ago but was unable to find him, and explained how he not only made him a better basketball player, but made him a better person. In return, Jordan offers Wilt fame and a place to stay in his mansion. However, Wilt decides to stay back at Foster's so he could someday be adopted by another kid, and the film ends with Wilt and Jordan playing a lopsided game of one-on-one basketball at Foster's.

During the credits, Wilt, Bloo, Mac, Eduardo, Coco, Frankie, and Mr. Herriman, are watching Jordan playing basketball during one of his professional games, with Wilt getting a little crazy on the commentary as the film ends.

Production 
The episode was unveiled by the network in Spring 2006.

Reception 
The episode kicked off a Thanksgiving marathon of the series to celebrate the show's float appearance at Macy's Thanksgiving Day Parade. The special attracted 10.5 million unique viewers.

Dave Dunnet, the background designer for the episode, won an Individual Achievement Emmy for his role in the episode.

References

External links
 

2006 American television episodes
2006 animated films
2006 television films
2006 films
Foster's Home for Imaginary Friends films
Cartoon Network television films
Films directed by Craig McCracken
Films directed by Rob Renzetti
Films with screenplays by Lauren Faust
Films with screenplays by Craig McCracken
American flash animated films
American children's animated comedy films
American children's animated fantasy films
Animated films about birds
Animated films about rabbits and hares
Animated films about children
Animated films about friendship
Annie Award winners
2000s American films